

References

Ivory Coast
Wars
Wars